Bigg may refer to:

People
 Bigg Jus, American rapper
 Henry Bigg (1690–1740), English academic administrator
 Michael Bigg (1939-1990), Canadian marine biologist
 John Stanyan Bigg (1828–1865), English poet

Businesses
 bigg's, a hypermarket chain in Ohio and Kentucky
 Mr Bigg's, Nigerian fast food chain

Other uses
 BiGG, a knowledge base for Metabolic network modelling
 Bigg City Port, location in the children's TV series Tugs
 Henry Bigg, character in the children's novel series The Littles

See also 

 Begg
 Biggs (disambiguation)
 Big (disambiguation)
 Bigg Mixx, a breakfast cereal
 Bigg's whale, a Transient killer whale